David Johannes Trobisch (born on August 18, 1958) is a German scholar whose work has focused on formation of the Christian Bible, ancient New Testament manuscripts and the epistles of Paul.

Life 
Trobisch grew up in Cameroon where his parents served as Lutheran missionaries, and David Trobisch grew up in West Africa.

Trobisch divides his time between Germany, where his wife, son and two grandchildren live, and a home in Springfield, Missouri. When in the U.S., he considers himself part of the Evangelical Lutheran Church in America.

Education 
Trobisch went to school in Austria and after passing the Abitur, (University entrance exam) in 1976 (Matura  BEA Saalfelden), he moved to Germany and also in 1976 he studied Koine Greek at Protestant Theology at Augustana Divinity School (Neuendettelsau). Trobisch also studied in Tübingen and in 1977 he studied biblical Hebrew at the Heidelberg University.

In 1982 Trobisch earned his Master of Theology from the Heidelberg University. From 1988 he holds his Doctor of Theology also from the Heidelberg University, under his advisor: Prof. Gerd Theissen with his thesis: Die Entstehung der Paulusbriefsammlung : Studien zu den Anfängen christlicher Publizistik. From 1995, Tobisch holds his Habilitation with the thesis Die Endredaktion des Neuen Testaments: eine Untersuchung zur Entstehung der christlichen Bibel from the University Heidelberg, Germany.

Teaching 

Trobisch has taught at the Heidelberg University, Missouri State University, Yale Divinity School.

From September 1996 to July 2008 he worked at the Bangor Theological Seminary, where he become Throckmorton-Hayes Professor of New Testament Language and Literature (2000-2009).

Academic work 

Trobisch served as the founding Director of Museum of the Bible. Since February 2014 to January 2015 he was Director of the Green Collection, Oklahoma City, Oklahoma, and from February 2015 to March 2018 he served as Director of Collections.

David Trobisch is also recognized for his work on the Letters of Paul, the Formation of the Christian Bible, Performance Theory in Antiquity, and Bible Manuscripts. He is on the editorial board of the Novum Testamentum Graece.

Ideas 

Since the publication of his book The First Edition of the New Testament in 2000, Trobisch has argued against the commonly held notion that the New Testament canon developed gradually over centuries. Instead, Trobisch argues that a collection of Christian scriptures closely approximating the modern New Testament canon "was edited and published by specific people at a very specific time and at a very specific place."

His argument centers around the striking uniformity found in ancient manuscripts of New Testament documents. According to Trobisch, almost all extant manuscripts document a closed collection of 27 books, listed in the same order and grouped in the same four volumes, bearing the same titles with very few variants, and all using the same unique system to mark sacred terms (nomina sacra). He also points out that nearly all manuscripts were published in the form of a codex, rather than the scroll format which was overwhelmingly dominant in non-Christian literature at the time. From these facts, Trobisch concludes that almost all our extant manuscripts of New Testament documents must be copies of a single, very influential published collection.

Trobisch argues that this "first edition of the New Testament" was published some time in the mid- to late second century. Because late second century and early third century Christian authors such as Irenaeus, Clement of Alexandria, and Tertullian seem to have used a canon of scripture very similar to the modern one, Trobisch holds that the New Testament must have been published before 180 CE.

In a 2007 article titled Who Published the New Testament?, Trobisch postulated that the publisher of the first edition of the New Testament may well have been Polycarp, an early bishop of Smyrna in Asia Minor. Trobisch based this conclusion on a variety of factors. Firstly, Polycarp was a well-known person in the mid-second century, who held authority among proto-Catholic Christians in both Rome and Asia Minor. Secondly, Polycarp was reputed to be a disciple of John the Apostle, so his authority would have been able to add credibility to the Gospel of John and the Johannine epistles of the New Testament, which are widely believed by modern scholars not to be authentic works of John the Apostle. Thirdly, Polycarp was known to be a vocal opponent of Marcionite Christianity, which Trobisch and many other scholars take to be a major impetus for the development of the New Testament canon. Finally, Polycarp is believed to have had experience in publishing, because he distributed the first collection of the epistles of Ignatius (see Pol. Phil. 13).

Views on Marcion 

Some time in the second century, the heretical Christian thinker Marcion of Sinope published his own Christian canon which contained a shorter version of the Gospel of Luke (the Gospel of Marcion) and ten Pauline epistles. Trobisch holds the view, shared by scholars such as John Knox and Joseph Tyson, that the gospel used by Marcion is earlier than the canonical Luke-Acts, and that Luke-Acts was in fact published as a response to Marcion's canon, contemporaneously with the publishing of the first edition of the New Testament as a whole.

Works

Theses

Books

References 

American biblical scholars
New Testament scholars
1958 births
Living people
Place of birth missing (living people)
Yale Divinity School faculty
Evangelical Lutheran Church in America Christians
American Lutherans
20th-century Lutherans
21st-century Lutherans
Lutheran biblical scholars
Marcionism